The list of ship decommissionings in 1980 includes a chronological list of all ships decommissioned in 1980.


See also 

1980
 Ship decommissionings
Ship